Franzetti is a surname of Italian origin. Notable people with the surname include:

 Alessandro Franzetti (born 1991), Italian paralympic rower
 Allison Brewster Franzetti, American pianist and music educator, wife of Carlos
 Carlos Franzetti (born 1948), Argentinian composer and arranger

Surnames of Italian origin